Hound dog or Hound Dog may refer to:
 Hound, a type of dog that assists hunters by tracking or chasing prey

Music
 "Hound Dog" (song), a 1952 song popularized in 1956 by Elvis Presley
 Hound Dog (band), a 1980s Japanese rock band
 Hound Dog Taylor (1915–1975), American blues guitarist
 Hound Dog, a brand of guitars of the Original Musical Instrument Company

Other uses
 Hounddog (film), a 2007 dramatic film starring Dakota Fanning
 AGM-28 Hound Dog, a US Air Force missile
 Hound Dog, a brand of lawn tools of Ames True Temper